Richard Smith (by 1516 – buried on 22 May 1581) was an English politician.

He was Mayor of Newcastle-under-Lyme 1547–48 and 1549–50. He was a Member (MP) of the Parliament of England for Newcastle-under-Lyme in November 1554 and 1555.

References

1581 deaths
Members of the Parliament of England for Newcastle-under-Lyme
English MPs 1554–1555
Year of birth uncertain
English MPs 1555
Mayors of places in Staffordshire